Belka is a small town located in the Wheatbelt region of Western Australia between the towns of Bruce Rock and Merredin.

The town originated as a station along the railway line for both passengers and heavy goods, and was gazetted in 1914. The word is Aboriginal in origin and is thought to mean ankle. A town hall was built in 1915 and a dam was also completed in the same year.

References

Towns in Western Australia
Shire of Bruce Rock